Noureddine Cherradi is a Moroccan basketball player. He competed in the men's tournament at the 1968 Summer Olympics.

References

Year of birth missing (living people)
Living people
Moroccan men's basketball players
Olympic basketball players of Morocco
Basketball players at the 1968 Summer Olympics
Place of birth missing (living people)